Nur is a 2018 Malaysian television drama series directed by Shahrulezad Mohameddin, starring Amyra Rosli as the titular role and Syafiq Kyle as Ustaz Adam. The series focuses on the relationship between a pious man and a prostitute who practices her faith in an unconventional manner. The premiere episode garnered 11 million viewers and became a controversy during its run. The series premiered on TV3 from 14 May 2018 to 14 June 2018 during the Ramadhan. A sequel, Nur 2 was aired in 2019, after the success of the prequel.

A feature film based on the series was planned. However, the anticipated production did not materialise. A theatre staging based on the series also was planned.

Plot
The story begins with Datuk Haji Mohsen holding a feast to celebrate the return of his son Adam from Jordan [Middle East] where he had gone to further his studies. Adam is now a qualified Usuluddin (an Islamic scholarship) graduate. Upon returning to his homeland, Adam being the eldest son of Celebrity Ustaz Datuk Haji Mohsen, with his new status as an Ustaz coupled with his good looks starts to gain popularity. His older sister Aishah is aware of his potential to become as famous as their father who is thinking of retiring. For that, Aishah starts to groom her brother to eventually take over their father's place. Various television program dealings and endorsements are arranged by Aishah which promise lucrative returns. Adam is promoted as the famous young ustaz (Islamic scholar) who would inherit his father's popularity one day. But everything changes after he meets a mysterious woman outside the mosque, Nur.

Cast

Main
Amyra Rosli as Nur
Syafiq Kyle as Ustaz Adam

Supporting
Riena Diana as Dr Qhadeeja
Laila Nasir as Mona
Noorkhiriah as Aishah
Azhan Rani as Ustaz Syed Hamadi
Jalaluddin Hassan as Datuk Ayah Haji Mukhsin
Fatimah Abu Bakar as Datin Ibu Hajah Musalmah
Raja Atiq as Amirul
Zaidi Omar as Datuk Taj uddin
Elmy Moin as Marzuki
Mathni Razak as Dr Mukhriz
Kuna Muzani as Datin Orkid
Jijie Zainal as Jo Jo

Awards and nominations

Sequel

According to the director Shahrulezad, a sequel is being planned. He said: "I was asked to produce Nur 2, because people wanted to know what happened to Nur and Hamadi. However I thought that in general any piece of work should not be extended just because it received a good response. After many had requested for it to be produced, including the TV3, I finally got involved. I then had a new storyline and presented to the station. They are confident and agree with the story." Nur 2 is co-produced by iflix and available to stream for free.

Coming Soon 2023

Actor: Amyra Rosli, Syafiq Kyle, Azar Azmi, Noorkhiriah, GM Fauzan, Jalaluddin Hassan, Fatimah Abu Bakar, Raja Atiq, Jijie Zainal, Eyra Hazali, Issac Iman & Nur Qistina Raisah

References

2018 Malaysian television series debuts
2010s Malaysian television series
Malaysian drama television series
TV3 (Malaysia) original programming